Charles White (August 12, 1927 – May 26, 1998) was an American professional baseball player who had a 15-year career in the game, including full seasons in the Negro leagues and in Major League Baseball.

Early career
After that season, he was acquired by the St. Louis Browns, whose owner, Bill Veeck, was active in integrating his organization's playing ranks. White spent three seasons in the upper levels of minor league baseball in the Browns' farm system before being traded to the Milwaukee Braves prior to the  season.

Major League career
Playing behind one of the league's workhorse catchers, Del Crandall, White appeared in 50 games in 1954, 16 as starting catcher (while Crandall started 133 of the Braves' 154 games). In his third Major League game, on April 23 against the St. Louis Cardinals at Busch Stadium, White hit his only big-league home run, a solo blow in the top of the 13th inning off Cot Deal. The homer temporarily put the Braves ahead, 5–4, and they would triumph, 7–5, in 14 innings with White handling the catching chores. He also had a three-hit game (in five at bats) against the Cardinals at Busch Stadium on July 5. But he batted only .237 for the season. At the outset of the 1955 campaign, White again backed up Crandall, and in the season's first two months he started nine games at catcher and batted .233. After his final MLB game on May 29, White played 10 more seasons at the Triple-A level, ten of them in the Pacific Coast League.

In his 62-game big-league career, White had 29 hits, including five doubles as well as his home run.

See also
 List of Negro league baseball players who played in Major League Baseball

References

External links

1927 births
1998 deaths
African-American baseball players
Baseball players from North Carolina
Hawaii Islanders players
Major League Baseball catchers
Milwaukee Braves players
People from Kinston, North Carolina
Philadelphia Stars players
Rochester Red Wings players
San Antonio Missions players
Portland Beavers players
Toronto Maple Leafs (International League) players
Vancouver Mounties players
Wichita Braves players
Winnipeg Buffaloes players
20th-century African-American sportspeople